Dacrycarpus cinctus is a species of conifer in the family Podocarpaceae. It is found in Indonesia and Papua New Guinea.

References

cinctus
Least concern plants
Taxonomy articles created by Polbot